A Holiday Carole (titled A Christmas Carole in the UK and Australia) is a holiday album, released on November 1, 2011, by American singer-songwriter Carole King. It is King's 17th studio album and her first studio album in 10 years since she released Love Makes the World as well as her last studio album to date. It was recorded by Nathaniel Kunkel and Niko Bolas.

History
On November 4, 2010, King's daughter, Louise Goffin, revealed on Myspace that she was working with Carole King on her first ever holiday album, stating "I am currently busy in the studio producing the new Carole King Holiday Record, set to release in 2011. We've had a fabulous time so far, working with the amazing Nathaniel Kunkel (engineer) and many talented musicians and background singers." However, no statements were made by King until on June 22, 2011, when a picture was posted on her Facebook profile with the caption "CK on upcoming holiday album: 'So this is what it boils down to…'"

On July 27, 2011, Billboard posted an article on the home page of its official website, stating various information about the record, including the first official announcement of the title of the album. The article stated that A Holiday Carole will "span an array of musical styles," including Latin and jazz.

Track listing
On July 28, 2011, USA Today revealed the official track list.

Unlike previous albums released by King, none of the songs was written or co-written by her (excluding the bonus tracks).

Charts

References

Carole King albums
2011 Christmas albums
Christmas albums by American artists
Pop Christmas albums
Hear Music albums
Concord Music Group albums
Covers albums